Morai may refer to:
Heiau, a Hawaiian temple.
Marae, a communal or sacred place that serves religious and social purposes in Polynesian societies.
Mirai (disambiguation), the Japanese word for the future and multiple other uses 
Moirai, the incarnations of destiny in Ancient Greek religion and mythology
Rashid Morai (1944–2014), a Pakistan poet and activist.